DeLima v. Bidwell, 182 U.S. 1 (1901), was one of a group of the first Insular Cases decided by the US Supreme Court.

The case was argued on January 8–11, 1901 and was decided on May 27, 1901.

The case is widely considered racist.

Background
The DeLima Sugar Importing Company sued the New York City collector of customs to recover duties on sugar imported from Puerto Rico after 1899, when Puerto Rico was ceded to the United States. DeLima argued that the Port of New York City had no jurisdiction to collect duties since Puerto Rico had been annexed by the United States.

The lower appellate court held the following:
 Although the collector had the right to challenge the factual sufficiency, he was barred from challenging federal jurisdiction on the basis of wrongful removal where the case was removed upon his own petition.
 The Customs Administrative Act did not decide whether the sugar was imported from a foreign country and so the court case was a proper legal action.
 Puerto Rico was not a foreign country for tariff purposes but was a United States territory because by the Treaty of Paris, the district was ceded to and in the possession of the United States. It was not necessary for an Act of Congress to embrace the territory for the purpose of tariff laws. Therefore, the duties on sugar were illegal, and DeLima Sugar Importing Company was entitled to a refund of its duties on sugar.

Decision
The Supreme Court ruled 5–4 that Puerto Rico, since its cession to the United States by the Treaty of Paris (1898), was not a foreign country for the purposes of US tariff laws, which required payment of duties on goods moving into the United States from a foreign country. In the absence of congressional legislation, the US government could not collect customs duties on sugar from Puerto Rico shipped to other parts of the United States by classifying Puerto Rico as a foreign country.

The majority opinion was authored by Justice Henry Billings Brown and joined by Justices Melville Fuller, John Marshall Harlan, Rufus Wheeler Peckham and David Josiah Brewer.

Justice Joseph McKenna authored a dissenting opinion, which was joined by Justices George Shiras, Jr., and Edward Douglass White. Justice Horace Gray authored a separate dissenting opinion.

The decision is similar to Downes v. Bidwell, 182 U.S. 244 (1901), which was decided on the same date.

See also
 Insular Cases
 List of United States Supreme Court cases, volume 182

References

External links
 
 

Sugar industry in Puerto Rico
History of sugar
Law of insular areas of the United States
Legal history of Puerto Rico
United States Supreme Court cases
United States Supreme Court cases of the Fuller Court
1901 in United States case law